Kimothy Emil Batiste (March 15, 1968 – October 7, 2020) was an American Major League Baseball infielder for the Philadelphia Phillies (1991–1994) and San Francisco Giants (1996), both of the National League. He was drafted in the third round of the  amateur draft by the Phillies. His major league debut came in 1991 with the Phillies. He was a key component of the Phillies 1993 National League Championship Series victory, delivering a game-winning RBI hit in the 10th inning of Game 1, though it was his error in the 9th inning that allowed the Braves to tie the game and force extra innings.

Batiste played four seasons with the Phillies as a backup shortstop and third baseman, and was released on May 15, 1995. He signed with the Baltimore Orioles as a free agent nine days later on May 24 and was assigned to the Bowie Baysox. He had a 14-game hitting streak with the Baysox before being promoted to the Rochester Red Wings where he spent the duration of the campaign. He never appeared in a major league game with the Orioles and was selected by the Giants in the Rule 5 draft on December 4, 1995. He played one year with the Giants before being released on October 1, 1996. Batiste went on to play in the independent Atlantic League, batting .233 in 12 games in 2003 for the Atlantic City Surf in his final professional season.

Batiste lived in Baton Rouge, Louisiana after his retirement.

Batiste died on October 7, 2020 from complications after kidney surgery.

References

External links

Kim Batiste at SABR (Baseball BioProject)
Kim Batiste at Baseball Almanac
Kim Batiste at Baseball Library

1968 births
2020 deaths
African-American baseball players
Philadelphia Phillies players
San Francisco Giants players
Baseball players from Louisiana
Sioux Falls Canaries players
Atlantic City Surf players
Nashua Pride players
Lehigh Valley Black Diamonds players
Camden Riversharks players
Allentown Ambassadors players
Bowie Baysox players
Chinatrust Whales players
American expatriate baseball players in Taiwan
Clearwater Phillies players
Phoenix Firebirds players
Reading Phillies players
Rochester Red Wings players
San Jose Giants players
Scranton/Wilkes-Barre Red Barons players
Spartanburg Phillies players
Utica Blue Sox players
20th-century African-American sportspeople
21st-century African-American people